Lehmanosteus is an extinct arthrodire placoderm fish. Its fossils have been found in Early Devonian strate. It was first referred to as Actinolepidae sp.

References 

Arthrodire genera
Emsian life
Fossil taxa described in 1984